Sir Daniel Eric Arthur Pettit (19 February 1915 – 28 July 2010) was an English footballer, soldier, and industrialist.

Early life
He was born in Liverpool, in 1915, the son of Thomas Edgar Pettit.

Football career
After graduating from Quarry Bank High School in Liverpool in 1934, Pettit played amateur football for Cambridge University, where he was reading History at Fitzwilliam House. Whilst still at university he represented Great Britain in Football at the 1936 Summer Olympics.

Later life
He served in the Second World War from 1940 with the Royal Artillery in Africa, India and Burma, demobilising with the rank of Major in 1946.

He taught at Highgate School from 1939 until December 1947 and subsequently became a distinguished industrialist, serving as chairman of the National Freight Corporation from 1971 to 1978, and Director of Lloyds Bank from 1977 to 1985. He was knighted for his services to industry in 1974.

He married in 1940 Winifred, daughter of William Bibby, by whom he had two sons. Pettit lived latterly at Bransford Court near Worcester.

References

External links

biography of Daniel Pettit
Mention of Daniel Pettit's 93rd birthday
Daniel Pettit's obituary
Article about Daniel Pettit

1915 births
2010 deaths
Alumni of Fitzwilliam College, Cambridge
Businesspeople awarded knighthoods
English footballers
English industrialists
Cambridge University A.F.C. players
Footballers at the 1936 Summer Olympics
Knights Bachelor
Olympic footballers of Great Britain
Association football midfielders
20th-century English businesspeople
British Army personnel of World War II
Royal Artillery officers